This is a list of notable people reported as having died from coronavirus disease 2019 (COVID-19), as a result of infection by the virus SARS-CoV-2 during the ongoing COVID-19 pandemic.

Index

Deaths

See also 

 Deaths in 2020
 Deaths in 2021
 Deaths in 2022
 Deaths in 2023
 Deaths of anti-vaccine advocates from COVID-19
 List of COVID-19 deaths in North America
 List of COVID-19 deaths in South Africa

References 

Dynamic lists
Deaths
Deaths from the COVID-19 pandemic
COVID-19
COVID-19
COVID-19
COVID-19
COVID-19
Articles with accessibility problems